The Nokia 7500 Prism is a mobile phone produced by Nokia. It is part of Nokia's Prism Collection. It is a triband phone that runs S40 5th Edition. The  screen has a resolution of 320x240 pixels showing 16 million colors. Included is a 2-megapixel camera with flash, a 512 MB microSD card, and a 700mAh battery. It launches during 3Q 2007.

Nokia 7500 has a stereo FM radio and a music player which can play mp3, wma and several other formats. It can play 3gp and mp4 video. The videos can be seen in full screen mode too.

Other specifications

References

External links
 Nokia 7500 Prism

7500
Mobile phones introduced in 2007
Mobile phones with user-replaceable battery